In the culture of the United States, the idea of Southernization came from the observation that Southern values and beliefs had become more central to political success, reaching an apogee in the 1990s, with a Democratic President and Vice President from the South and Congressional leaders in both parties being from the South. Some commentators said that Southern values seemed increasingly important in national elections through the early 21st century. American journalists in the late 2000s used the term "Southernization" to describe the political and cultural effects.

Description 
Values and beliefs often ascribed to the American South include religious conservatism, particularly Protestantism, culture of honor, Southern hospitality, military tradition, agrarian ideals and American nationalism.  Besides the cultural influence, some said that the South had infiltrated the national political stage.

In 1992, the winning presidential ticket consisted of Bill Clinton, the Governor of Arkansas; and Al Gore, a Senator from Middle Tennessee. From both parties, many leaders in Congress were also from the South. Meanwhile, according to Michael Lind, professor of public affairs at University of Texas at Austin, the Republican Party underwent its own Southernization as more Republican leaders called for policies and principles previously held by conservative or moderate Southern Democrats. Commentators such as Adam Nossiter and Michael Hirsh suggest that politics reached its apogee of Southernization in the 1990s.

Southernization of the national politics of the United States can be also noticed in presidential elections. From the Civil War until 1963 there was only one President from the Southern United States, Andrew Johnson, but since then five of the last eleven Presidents have been from the region: Lyndon B. Johnson, Jimmy Carter, George H. W. Bush, Bill Clinton, and George W. Bush.

Other uses 
The term "Southernization" has also been used by historians to describe the influence of South Asia on the rest of the world by the 5th century A.D. This is intended to be similar to the use of Westernization for the influence of the West on the rest of the world since the 15th century and the beginning of exploration and colonization. Examples of South Asian influence include Hindu-Arabic numerals; the spread of Buddhism; production and overseas trade of sugar, cotton and spices; and the spread of other inventions and discoveries.

See also 

 Political culture of the United States
 Politics of the Southern United States
 Red states and blue states
 Sun Belt, the growth of the Sun Belt coincided with the process of Southernization
 Flyover country

References

Further reading 
 
 
 
 

Political terminology of the United States
Culture of the Southern United States
Politics of the Southern United States
Regionalism (politics)